Aneta Maria Szczepańska (born June 20, 1974) is a Polish judoka.

She won the silver medal in the middleweight (66 kg) division at the 1996 Summer Olympics.

Awards
For her sport achievements, she received: 
  Golden Cross of Merit in 1996.

References

External links

 
 
 
  

1974 births
Living people
Polish female judoka
Olympic judoka of Poland
Judoka at the 1996 Summer Olympics
Olympic silver medalists for Poland
People from Włocławek
Olympic medalists in judo
Sportspeople from Kuyavian-Pomeranian Voivodeship
Medalists at the 1996 Summer Olympics
20th-century Polish women